A by-election was held for the United Kingdom Parliament seat of Leicester South on 15 July 2004. It was triggered by the death of Labour Party Member of Parliament (MP) Jim Marshall, who died on 27 May 2004, shortly before the local and European elections in June. The by-election was won by Parmjit Singh Gill of the Liberal Democrats, over-turning a Labour majority of 13,243 votes at the 2001 general election.

This by-election was held on the same day as the Birmingham Hodge Hill by-election, which Labour won with a highly reduced majority of just 460 votes (2.3%).

Background
Leicester South was first won by Jim Marshall in 1974. He lost the seat to the Conservative Party candidate, Derek Spencer, in the 1983 general election by a mere 7 votes, but won it back at the 1987 election. Marshall won the constituency with a majority of 13,243 (31.4%) at the 2001 election.

The constituency is diverse, covering leafy suburbs such as Stoneygate and Knighton along with inner city areas with a strong South Asian community, one of the largest such populations in the UK. The by-election was considered a referendum on Blair's policies, especially the ongoing Iraq War, for which Labour had received heavy backlash from Asian and Muslim voters. The war had also been blamed for the party's major losses in the local elections of both 2003 and 2004.

Candidates
The Labour Party chose Peter Soulsby to fight the by-election. Soulsby had previously been head of Leicester City Council for 18 years and also acted as the election agent for Jim Marshall at the 2001 general election.

The Liberal Democrats selected Parmjit Singh Gill, who was a councillor on Leicester City Council's Stoneygate Ward and had also been the Leicester South candidate at the 2001 general election. He claimed his central issues would be "Iraq, top-up fees, health and schools" and that he would "be a local MP who will work hard for everyone in our area."

Chris Heaton-Harris was announced as the Conservative candidate, despite having only recently been elected as an Member of the European Parliament (MEP) for the East Midlands. Soulsby criticised this, telling The Guardian: "Leicester South needs a full-time local champion, not a two-jobs who doesn't even live here and who can't make up his mind whether he wants to be in Brussels or Westminster."

Yvonne Ridley, a former journalist who was held in captivity in Afghanistan by the Taliban and later converted to Islam, stood for the Respect Party. "I'm not just fighting this seat to compete," she said. "I'm fighting it to win, and I believe we can win."

Bob Ball was chosen to stand for the Green Party, but later withdrew. The Greens said that they were short of money after the European Parliament elections and wanted to concentrate resources on the next general election.

Results

In his victory speech, Gill said, "Yesterday, Lord Butler gave his views on Tony Blair's reasoning for backing the invasion of Iraq. Today, people in Leicester have given theirs." He then went on to say, "The justification which Tony Blair gave for backing George Bush was wrong. The people of Leicester South have spoken for the people of Britain. Their message is that the prime minister has abused and lost their trust. He should apologise and he should apologise now."

At the 2005 general election, the Liberal Democrats were unable to retain the seat and Soulsby became Leicester South's MP.

Previous result

References

External links
Campaign literature from the by-election
Leicester Mercury article
BBC News article

By-elections to the Parliament of the United Kingdom in Leicestershire constituencies
2004 elections in the United Kingdom
2004 in England
July 2004 events in the United Kingdom
Elections in Leicester
2000s in Leicester